In Greek mythology, Alpos (Ancient Greek: Ἄλπον) was Sicilian giant son of Gaea (Earth).

Description 
Like the Hundred-Handed Ones, Alpos had many arms, and his head was covered with vipers, like Medusa:
{|
|
 Alpos with a hundred vipers on his head for hair, who touched the Sun, and pulled back the Moon, and tormented the company of stars with his tresses.|-
|
 Alpos bent his knee, that son of Earth with huge body rising near the clouds.
|}

 Mythology 
Alpos once terrorized Pelorus (modern day: Punta del Faro) in Sicily as described by Nonnus in his Dionysiaca:

 No wayfarer then climbed the height of that rock, for fear of the raging Giant and his row of mouths; and if one in ignorance travelled on that forbidden road whipping a bold horse, the son of Earth spied him, pulled him over the rock with a tangle of many hands, entombed man and colt in his gullet! Often some old shepherd leading his sheep to pasture along the wooded hillside at midday was gobbled up. In those days melodious Pan never sat beside herds of goats or sheepcotes playing his tune on the assembled reeds, no imitating Echo returned the sounds of his pipes; but prattler as she was, silence sealed those lips which were wont to sound with the pipe of Pan never silent, because the Giant then oppressed all. No cowherd then came, no band of woodmen cutting timbers for a ship troubled the Nymphs of the trees, their age-mates, no clever shipwright clamped together a barge, the woodriveted car that travels the roads of the sea...

Eventually, the giant was killed by Dionysus with his thyrsus in an epic battle:

Alpos who does not appear elsewhere in Greek mythology, and received no cult, may be considered an invention of the fertile imagination of Nonnus.

Notes

 References 

 Nonnus of Panopolis, Dionysiaca translated by William Henry Denham Rouse (1863-1950), from the Loeb Classical Library, Cambridge, MA, Harvard University Press, 1940.  Online version at the Topos Text Project.
 Nonnus of Panopolis, Dionysiaca. 3 Vols.'' W.H.D. Rouse. Cambridge, MA., Harvard University Press; London, William Heinemann, Ltd. 1940-1942. Greek text available at the Perseus Digital Library.

Ancient Sicily
Greek giants
Children of Gaia